Gawa Na ang Bala Na Papatay sa Iyo is a 1988 Philippine action film directed by Willy Milan from the story and script by Pablo S. Gomez. The film stars Fernando Poe Jr., Vic Vargas, Marianne Dela Riva, Subas Herrero, and Harlene Bautista. Produced by Lea Productions, the film was released on November 30, 1988.

Critic Lav Diaz noted its intense violence in comparison with Poe's previous films, and gave it a mixed review. Bautista won the Film Academy of the Philippines Award for Best Supporting Actress.

Cast
Fernando Poe Jr. as David Villafuerte
Vic Vargas as Berto
Marianne Dela Riva as Ester
Subas Herrero as Don Rico Montefalcon
Harlene Bautista as Lisa
Rosemarie Gil as Doña Carmela
Paquito Diaz as Alex
Berting Labra as Turo
Johnny Vicar as Viston
Mario Escudero as Andres
Toytoy Velayo
Alma Lerma
Vic Varrion
Aida Pedido as Aling Mering

Production
The film was originally titled Hindi Pa Nagagawa ang Bala para sa Akin.

Release
Gawa Na ang Bala was graded "A" by the Movie and Television Review and Classification Board (MTRCB), indicating a "Very Good" quality. The film was released on November 30, 1988. According to Meg Mendoza of the Manila Standard, there were long lines of patrons for the film outside Cubao theaters, stating that "[i]n one of the theaters, the moviegoers occupied the whole lobby and spilled over to the nearest bank down to the sidewalks."

Critical response
Lav Diaz, writing for the Manila Standard, observed that the film was more violent than actor Fernando Poe's previous films, seeming to follow the trend of ultra-violent action from western movies such as the Rambo franchise, though it still follows the revenge story formula found in Poe's other works. Overall, he gave a mixed review, commending the execution of action sequences and Poe's performance while criticizing the "gangland" portrayal of combat and the stale writing for Subas Herrero and Paquito Diaz's characters.

Accolades

References

External links

1988 films
1988 action films
Filipino-language films
Philippine action films
Philippine films about revenge
Films with screenplays by Pablo S. Gomez
Films directed by Willy Milan